Apostolici may refer to:

Apostolici, Apostolic Brethren, or Apostles, names given to various Christian sects whose common doctrinal feature was an ascetic rigidity of morals. These included:
The Apostolic Brethren, a Christian sect founded in northern Italy in the latter half of the 13th century by Gerard Segarelli.
Apostolici Regiminis was a papal bull issued 19 December 1513 by Pope Leo X, not to be confused with:
Regiminis Apostolici was a papal bull promulgated by Pope Alexander VII in 1665. 
Apostolici Ministerii was a papal bull issued 23 May 1724 by Pope Innocent XIII for the revival of ecclesiastical discipline in Spain. 
Ab apostolici was a papal encyclical promulgated by Leo XIII on 15 October 1890.
Cursores apostolici was the Latin title of the ecclesiastical heralds or pursuivants pertaining to the papal court.
Historia Certaminis Apostolici is a book that was traditionally ascribed to Abdias of Babylon.